The following is a list of Polish Armies during World War II, together with their commanders and brigade and division-sized units. For a more detailed list see: Polish army order of battle in 1939.

During the Invasion of Poland several divisions were grouped into two units smaller than armies: the Wyszków Operational Group and the Narew Independent Operational Group.

See also
 Air Force of the Polish Army (in the East)
 Polish Air Forces in France and Great Britain
 Polish Navy in World War II
 List of Polish divisions in World War II
 Polish army order of battle in 1939
 Polish contribution to World War II

World War II
Polish Armies
 
Armies in World War II